Aimee Carter (born January 24, 1986) is an American writer of children's and young adult fiction.

Biography
Aimee Carter was born on January 24, 1986, in Detroit, Michigan, where she currently resides. She wrote fan fiction before she wrote her first original story. 

Carter graduated from the University of Michigan with a degree in Screen Arts and Cultures. She also earned a First Degree black belt in Tae Kwon Do from Progressive Martial Arts.

Published works

Middle Grade books

The Zac Trilogy 
Blue Car Nights (November 1, 2004)
Words Without Rhyme (November 1, 2004)
Leaving to Stay (November 1, 2004)

Simon Thorn 
Simon Thorn and the Wolf's Den (Bloomsbury, February 2, 2016)
Animox - Das Heulen der Wölfe, German translation, (Oetinger, August 22, 2016)
Simon Thorn and the Viper's Pit (Bloomsbury, February 7, 2017)
Animox - Das Auge der Schlange, German translation, (Oetinger, March 20, 2017)
Simon Thorn and the Shark's Cave (Bloomsbury, February 6, 2018)
Animox - Die Stadt der Haie, German translation, (Oetinger, October 23, 2017)
Simon Thorn and the Black Widow’s Web (unpublished)
Animox – Der Biss der Schwarzen Witwe, German translation, (Oetinger, July, 2018)
Simon Thorn and the Eagle’s Lair (unpublished)
Animox - Der Flug des Adlers, German translation, (Oetinger, February 25, 2019)
Die Erben der Animox, Die Beute des Fuchs
Die Erben der Animox, Das Gift des Oktopus

Standalone 

 Curse of the Phoenix (June 8, 2021)

Young Adult books

The Goddess Test 

 The Goddess Test (2011)
 Goddess Interrupted (2012)
 The Goddess Inheritance (2013)

Novellas

 The Goddess Hunt (2012)
 The Goddess Legacy (2012)
 The Goddess Queen (2012)
 The Lovestruck Goddess (2012)
 Goddess of the Underground (2012)
 God of Thieves (2012)
 God of Darkness (2012)

The Blackcoat Rebellion 
Pawn (November 26, 2013)
Captive (November 2014)
Queen (November 24, 2015)

References

External links
 

21st-century American novelists
1986 births
Living people
American young adult novelists
People from Wayne County, Michigan
American women novelists
University of Michigan alumni
Novelists from Michigan
21st-century American women writers
Women writers of young adult literature